Ashish Kumar Ballal (born 8 October 1970) is a former Indian goalkeeper of field hockey. He represented India in 275 international matches in the 1992 Barcelona Olympics, the 1990 World cup, 3 Champions Trophy tournaments (1989, 1993, 1996), 2 Asian Games (1994, 1998) and 2 Asia Cups (1989, 1993). Ballal became a household name in India when he saved two tie-breaker goals in the 1998 Bangkok Asian Games final against South Korea. India, captained by Ballal, went on to win the Asiad hockey gold at Bangkok after a gap of 32 years.

For his outstanding contribution to the game of hockey, Ballal was bestowed with the Arjuna Award in 1997 by the Government of India And the Eklavya Award in 2000 by the government of Karnataka. He coaches hockey players of India. In a laudable effort, he runs the Ashish  Ballal Hockey Academy in Bangalore as his way of giving back to the game of hockey in India.

Personal life
Ballal hails from the Bunt community and is married to fellow Bunt Sahana. He is a father to two sons, Vansh Ballal and Yash Ballal.

References

External links
 

Recipients of the Arjuna Award
Indian field hockey coaches
Mangaloreans
Living people
People from Dakshina Kannada district
Field hockey players from Karnataka
1970 births
Indian male field hockey players
Male field hockey goalkeepers
Asian Games gold medalists for India
Asian Games silver medalists for India
Medalists at the 1994 Asian Games
Medalists at the 1998 Asian Games
Asian Games medalists in field hockey
Field hockey players at the 1994 Asian Games
Field hockey players at the 1998 Asian Games
1990 Men's Hockey World Cup players
Olympic field hockey players of India
Field hockey players at the 1992 Summer Olympics